Margelov is a Russian masculine surname, its feminine counterpart is Margelova. It may refer to
Mikhail Margelov (born 1964), Russian politician
Vasily Margelov (1908–1990), Soviet general
Medal "Army General Margelov"
Vitaly Vasilyevich Margelov (1941-2021), Soviet and Russian general and politician

Russian-language surnames